Amau or AMAU may refer to:
 AMA University, in the Philippines
 Amau Doctrine, a Japanese nationalist ideology
 Marama Amau (born 1991), Tahitian footballer